"D'oh Canada" is the twenty-first episode of the thirtieth season of the American animated television series The Simpsons, and the 660th episode overall. It aired in the United States on Fox on April 28, 2019. The title of the episode is a play on the national anthem "O Canada."

Plot
The Simpson family is at the Mt. Splashmore water park, in line to ride the water slide, when Homer suddenly hustles the family out of the park.

Homer has earned two million soon-to-expire hotel rewards loyalty points, and takes them to Niagara Falls, traveling through upstate New York.  At the falls, Lisa accidentally plunges over the falls while roughhousing with Bart, and is rescued by a Canadian Mountie.

Lisa is taken to a hospital, where she is kept for observation. Homer balks at the cost, but is reminded that Canadian healthcare is free. Lisa starts to rant to the Mountie about America, and is declared a political refugee.

Lisa is placed in a foster home, while the rest of the family return to Springfield. Lisa starts attending Alanis Morissette Elementary School, and Skypes with Prime Minister Justin Trudeau. When asked about the SNC-Lavalin affair, he quickly escapes out the window.

At the Detroit River on Ambassador Bridge, Marge hides in Squeaky-Voiced Teen's car to get to the foster home, and forces Lisa to return home. However they learn that they cannot return back to Springfield due to deportation, and are thus stuck in Canada.

Marge however plans to cross the border line but Lisa is still unsure if she wants to leave the wonderful country. She then has a vision of several of her favorite American figures including Abraham Lincoln, Dumbo, Aretha Franklin, Eleanor Roosevelt, Seabiscuit the horse, Watson the computer who won Jeopardy!, Judy Blume, and Louis Armstrong, who convince her to go home.  

With the help of Bart and Homer, Lisa and Marge sneak across a frozen river back to the United States.

Reception and controversy
Dennis Perkins of The A.V. Club gave the episode a B−, stating, "’D’oh Canada’ wants to skewer its targets on the American side of the border by having Lisa's infatuation with all things Canadian (politeness, a hunky young Prime Minister, mounties with handsome horses, cape-wearing rescue beavers, free healthcare, schools that put on thought-provoking productions of Canadian literary legend Margaret Atwood’s The Handmaid's Tale) focus the show’s barbs more sharply and directly than usual."

"D'oh Canada" scored a 0.8 rating with a 4 share and was watched by 1.93 million people.

The musical mock salute to upstate New York drew substantial attention from the natives of that area, including a response from the New York State Republican Committee blaming the policies of Andrew Cuomo for making the region a laughingstock and a fact check from the Rochester Democrat and Chronicle, which concluded most of the claims were true but that some (such as Fox News viewership and disability claims) were misleading or unprovable. The Great New York State Fair responded that they were taking the song in jest but would invite the writers to the fair to allow them to see the area in person.

The episode came under fire in late April 2019 for offending some people. While the episode mocked then American President Donald Trump and Canadian Prime Minister Justin Trudeau and brought up the SNC-Lavalin affair, the aspects that caused offense were largely related to the Frank Sinatra parody song where Homer made fun of Upstate New York and for the use of the term "newfie" in relation to Canadian residents of Newfoundland. In the latter several Canadian children chime "stupid newfies" before a character closely resembling Ralph Wiggum calls himself one and proceeds to beat a baby seal pup plush toy with a club while singing about being a Newfoundlander. Musician Bruce Moss rejected an offer from the show's producers to use his song "The Islander" for the episode, referring to them as "morally bankrupt" and turning down $20,000 US.

References

2019 American television episodes
The Simpsons (season 30) episodes
Television episodes set in Canada
Niagara Falls in fiction
Animation controversies in television
Television controversies in Canada